Rauch House is a historic home located near Martinsburg, Berkeley County, West Virginia, USA. It was built in 1898 and is a two-story, brick Victorian Gothic-style residence. It measures three bays wide and six bays deep and has a steeply pitched hip roof with projecting gables. Also on the property is a barn (1897), smokehouse (1898), chicken house (1898) and pen building (1899).

It was listed on the National Register of Historic Places in 1994.

References

Houses on the National Register of Historic Places in West Virginia
Gothic Revival architecture in West Virginia
Houses completed in 1898
Houses in Berkeley County, West Virginia
National Register of Historic Places in Berkeley County, West Virginia